María Bernarda Seitz (born Florentina Seitz; 19 June 1927 – 16 June 2014), better known as La Hermana Bernarda (Sister Bernarda), was an Argentine Roman Catholic nun, writer, chef, and television presenter.

She became a star of culinary television through programs in which she prepared recipes of German origin, and shared her beliefs and impressions about God, the Church, love, and family.

Seitz hosted Dulces Tentaciones (Sweet Temptations) on the Elgourmet.com channel for several years with great success, as well as shows on América TV. She wrote a series of cookbooks, including the 2003 bestseller 100 recetas: cocina y meditación (100 Recipes: Cooking and Meditation).

Biography
Florentina Seitz was born in General Acha, La Pampa Province, on 19 June 1927, the daughter of Volga Germans Enrique and Barbara Seitz. Her childhood was spent between La Pampa and Coronel Suárez, and later in her father's fields in the south of Córdoba Province.

In 1944, at age 16, she entered the Sisters of the Holy Cross Menzingen, where she received the name María Bernarda, in honor of the congregation's founder, Bernarda Heimgartner.

She lived in Germany and Switzerland in 1986 and 1987, to study cooking and reconnect with her family's origins.

She rose to fame in 2000, with the debut of her program Dulces Tentaciones on Elgourmet.com. Rather than shooting on a set, Seitz cooked in the kitchen of the convent where she lived. She taught viewers how to prepare typical German meals in a simple way, maximizing the use of resources. Despite her status as a Catholic nun, in her programs she referred to God in a way unrelated to a specific religion. Her show became a ratings hit and was shown twice a week.

Her 2003 book 100 recetas: cocina y meditación was a major success, selling 200,000 copies.

Some time later, she came to broadcast television, where she hosted her own program on América TV. In 2003, Elgourmet.com brought her back to host Saladas Tentaciones (Savory Temptations), the second edition of Dulces Tentaciones. She made frequent appearances on Mirtha Legrand's program, often cooking dishes for the other guests.

Seitz died from a stroke on 16 June 2014.

Books

References

External links
 

1927 births
2014 deaths
21st-century Roman Catholic nuns
21st-century Argentine women writers
21st-century Argentine writers
Argentine television chefs
Argentine people of Swiss-German descent
Argentine women television presenters
People from La Pampa Province